Muhammad Afzaal Ahmad Hussain Gilani (also known as Sakhiy-e-Kamil, Mahboob-e-Khaas) (1926–1998 CE) was a Pakistani Sufi mystic.

The shrine of Gilani, as well as his father Ahmad Hussain Gilani Qadri (1899–1961), is situated at Mundair Kalan.

Ashfaq Niaz wrote a brief summary of the life of Gilani in his book Tareekh-i-Sialkot.

Pakistani Sufis
1926 births
1998 deaths
People from Sialkot District